John III of Auvergne (1467 – 28 March 1501), Count of Auvergne, Count of Boulogne, Count de Lauraguais, was the son of Bertrand VI, Count of Auvergne and Louise de La Trémoille (1432 – 10 April 1474), Dame de Boussac, the daughter of Georges de la Trémoille. He was the last in the line of Counts of Auvergne and Boulogne from the La Tour d'Auvergne family. After his death Boulogne-sur-Mer was integrated into the royal domain.

Family and children
John married Jeanne de Bourbon-Vendôme, daughter of Jean VIII, Count of Vendôme, and Isabelle, Dame de la Roche-sur-Yon, on 11 January 1495. They had:
 Anne, married John Stewart, 2nd Duke of Albany.
 Madeleine, married Lorenzo II, Duke of Urbino.

References

Sources

1467 births
1501 deaths
Dukes of Auvergne
La Tour d'Auvergne
15th-century French people